Miguel Matías Galuccio (born April 23, 1968) is an Argentine petroleum engineer and executive. He was appointed CEO of the state energy firm YPF upon its renationalization on May 5, 2012. He is also the CEO of Vista Oil and Gas.

Biography
Galuccio was born in Paraná, Entre Ríos Province, in 1968. He enrolled at the Institute of Technology of Buenos Aires (ITBA) and graduated with a degree in petroleum engineering in 1994.

He joined YPF shortly after graduation, and worked in the Dallas-based Maxus subsidiary following its 1995 acquisition by YPF. He was designated head of operations and development in the firm's Patagonian oil fields division in 1996, and of YPF's oil fields Indonesia in 1998.

Galuccio resigned his post following the 1999 acquisition of YPF by Madrid-based Repsol. He joined Houston-based oilfield services firm Schlumberger, and was designated general manager of the firm's operations in Mexico and Central America. This division grew under Galuccio, with whom the Mexican state oil firm Pemex signed numerous oil services contracts. He was named director of the Schlumberger Integrated Project Management (IPM) division in 2005, and in 2011 became the director of Schlumberger Production Management; based in London, the latter was a division created by Galuccio for the oilfield services leader.

Governor Sergio Urribarri of Entre Ríos Province recommended Galuccio to President Cristina Fernández de Kirchner on March 4 as an energy policy adviser; Galuccio's brother, Carlos, had served as director of the Entre Ríos Industrial Union (the local chapter of the Argentine Industrial Union manufacturers' association). The president interviewed Galuccio on April 4, and following her introduction of a bill in Congress on April 16 to renationalize 51% of YPF, the Schlumberger executive resigned his post. He was appointed CEO by President Fernández de Kirchner upon her signing the firm's renationalization into law on May 5.

References

External links

1968 births
Living people
People from Paraná, Entre Ríos
Argentine people of Italian descent
Argentine engineers
Petroleum engineers
Argentine chief executives